Márton Tóth is a Hungarian sprint canoer who has competed since the late 2000s. He won a bronze medal in the C-2 1000 m event at the 2010 ICF Canoe Sprint World Championships in Poznań.

References
2010 ICF Canoe Sprint World Championships men's C-2 1000 m A final results.  - accessed 21 August 2010

Hungarian male canoeists
Living people
Year of birth missing (living people)
ICF Canoe Sprint World Championships medalists in Canadian
21st-century Hungarian people